Kohlenschiffhafen (Coal ship harbour) is a harbour basin of the port of Hamburg, Germany, connected with the Norderelbe anabranch of River Elbe. It is located between the promontories of Köhlbrandhöft to the west and Tollerort to the east. It marks the former mouth of the Köhlbrand anabranch into the Norderelbe.

History
After the third Köhlbrand treaty between Hamburg and Prussia, works began to relocate the Köhlbrand anabranch  to the west. The former pathway is marked by the Kohlenschiffhafen, which was completed around 1920.

The harbour basin was filled up with sand since 2002. The expanded Container Terminal Tollerort can be found on the largely filled in harbour basin today. Works are underway in 2016 to fill up the small rest of the basin.

References

Geography of Hamburg
Hamburg-Mitte
Ports and harbours of Germany